Adercosaurus is a genus of the lizard family Gymnophthalmidae. The genus is monotypic, i.e. it has only one species, Adercosaurus vixadnexus. It occurs in Venezuela.

References

Gymnophthalmidae
Monotypic lizard genera
Taxa named by Charles W. Myers
Taxa named by Maureen Ann Donnelly